The 1922-23 season in Swedish football, starting March 1922 and ending July 1923:

Honours

Official titles

Competitions

Promotions, relegations and qualifications

Promotions

League transfers

Relegations

Domestic results

Division 1 Svenska Serien Östra 1922–23

Division 1 Svenska Serien Västra 1922–23

Division 1 Svenska Serien play-off 1922–23

Division 1 Svenska Serien qualification play-off 1922–23

Division 2 Uppsvenska Serien 1922–23

Division 2 Mellansvenska Serien 1922

Division 2 Västsvenska Serien 1922–23

Svenska Mästerskapet 1922 
Final

Kamratmästerskapen 1922 
Final

National team results 

 Sweden: 

 Sweden: 

 Sweden: 

 Sweden: 

 Sweden: 

 Sweden: 

 Sweden: 

 Sweden: 

 Sweden: 

 Sweden: 

 Sweden:

National team players in season 1922/23

Notes

References 
Print

Online

 
Seasons in Swedish football
, Swedish
, Swedish